A grader, also commonly referred to as a road grader,  motor grader, or simply a blade, is a form of heavy equipment with a long blade used to create a flat surface during grading. Although the earliest models were towed behind horses, and later tractors, most modern graders are self-propelled and thus technically "motor graders".

Typical graders have three axles, with the steering wheels in front, followed by the grading blade, then a cab and engine atop tandem rear axles. Some graders also have front wheel drive for improved performance. Some graders have optional rear attachments, such as a  ripper, scarifier, or compactor. A blade forward of the front axle may also be added. For snowplowing and some dirt grading operations, a main blade extension can also be mounted.

Capacities range from a blade width of 2.50 to 7.30 m (8 to 24 ft) and engines from 93–373 kW (125–500 hp). Certain graders can operate multiple attachments, or be designed for specialized tasks like underground mining.

Function
In civil engineering "rough grading" is performed by heavy equipment such as wheel tractor-scrapers and bulldozers. Graders are used to "finish grade", with the angle, tilt (or pitch) and height of their blade capable of being adjusted to  a high level of precision.

Graders are commonly used in the construction and maintenance of dirt and gravel roads. In constructing paved roads, they prepare a wide flat base course for the final road surface. Graders are also used to set native soil or gravel foundation pads to finish grade prior to the construction of large buildings. Graders can produce canted surfaces for drainage or safety. They may be used to produce drainage ditches with shallow V-shaped cross-sections on either side of highways.

Steering is performed via a steering wheel, or a joystick capable of controlling both the angle and cant of the front wheels.  Many models also allow frame articulation between the front and rear axles, which allows a smaller turning radius in addition to allowing the operator to adjust articulation angle to aid in the efficiency of moving material. Other implement functions are typically hydraulically powered, and can be directly controlled by levers, or by joystick inputs or electronic switches controlling electrohydraulic servo valves.

Graders are also outfitted with modern digital grade control technologies, such as those manufactured by Topcon Positioning Systems, Inc., Trimble Navigation, Leica Geosystems or Mikrofyn. These may combine both laser and GPS guidance  to extablish precise grade control and (potentially) "stakeless" construction. Manufacturers such as John Deere have also began to integrate these technologies during construction.

History

Early graders were drawn by humans and draft animals. The era of motorization by traction engines, steam tractors, motor trucks, and tractors saw such towed graders grow in size and productivity. The first self-propelled grader was made in 1920 by the Russell Grader Manufacturing Company, which called it the Russell Motor Hi-Way Patrol. These early graders were created by adding the grader blade as an attachment to a generalist tractor unit. After purchasing the company in 1928, Caterpillar went on to truly integrate the tractor and grader into one design—at the same time replacing crawler tracks with wheels to yield the first rubber-tire self-propelled grader, the Caterpillar Auto Patrol, released in 1931.

Regional uses

In addition to their use in road construction, graders may also be used to perform roughly equivalent work.

In some locales such as Northern Europe, Canada, and places in the United States, graders are often used in municipal and residential snow removal. In scrubland and grassland areas of Australia and Africa, graders are often an essential piece of equipment on ranches, large farms, and plantations to make dirt tracks where the absence of rocks and trees means bulldozers are not required.

Manufacturers

 Case Construction Equipment
 Caterpillar Inc.
 Deere & Company
 Galion Iron Works
 HEPCO
 Komatsu Limited
 LiuGong Construction Machinery, LLC.
 Mitsubishi Heavy Industries
 New Holland Construction
 Sany
 SDLG
 Terex Corporation
 Volvo
 XCMG

See also

 King road drag
 Land grading

References

External links
 Video with technical development from graders
 photos/videos from different type of grader works
 A Road-Scraper That Cuts Through Snow, Popular Science monthly, February 1919, page 26, Scanned by Google Books: https://books.google.com/books?id=7igDAAAAMBAJ&pg=PA26
 http://www.wisegeek.com/what-are-road-graders.htm

Construction equipment
Engineering vehicles
Heavy equipment
Road construction
Snow removal
American inventions